This is a list of places in South Korea which have standing links to local communities in other countries. In most cases, the association, especially when formalised by local government, is known as "town twinning" (usually in Europe) or "sister cities" (usually in the rest of the world).

A
Ansan

 Anshan, China
 Kholmsk, Russia
 Las Vegas, United States
 Yuzhno-Sakhalinsk, Russia

Anseong

 Brea, United States
 Heyuan, China

Anyang

 Anyang, China
 Garden Grove, United States
 Hampton, United States
 Komaki, Japan
 Naucalpan de Juárez, Mexico
 Sorocaba, Brazil
 Tokorozawa, Japan
 Ulan-Ude, Russia
 Weifang, China

B
Bonghwa

 Selenge, Mongolia
 Tongchuan, China

Boryeong

 Fujisawa, Japan
 Hangu (Tianjin), China
 Qingpu (Shanghai), China
 Shoreline, United States
 Takahama, Japan

Buan
 Wulong (Chongqing), China

Bucheon

 Bakersfield, United States 
 Harbin, China
 Khabarovsk, Russia
 Valenzuela, Philippines

Busan

 Auckland, New Zealand
 Barcelona, Spain
 Casablanca, Morocco
 Cebu, Philippines
 Chicago, United States
 Dubai, United Arab Emirates
 Fukuoka, Japan
 Ho Chi Minh City, Vietnam
 Istanbul, Turkey
 Kaohsiung, Taiwan
 Los Angeles, United States
 Montreal, Canada
 Mumbai, India
 Phnom Penh, Cambodia
 Rio de Janeiro, Brazil
 Saint Petersburg, Russia
 Shanghai, China
 Shimonoseki, Japan
 Surabaya, Indonesia
 Thessaloniki, Greece
 Tijuana, Mexico
 Valparaíso, Chile
 Victoria (state), Australia
 Vladivostok, Russia
 Western Cape, South Africa
 Yangon, Myanmar

C
Changwon

 Annapolis, United States
 Da Nang, Vietnam
 Guadalajara, Mexico
 Himeji, Japan
 Jacksonville, United States
 Jersey City, United States
 Kure, Japan
 Ma'anshan, China
 Mỹ Tho, Vietnam
 Nantong, China
 Shulan, China
 Ussuriysk, Russia
 Viña del Mar, Chile
 Yamaguchi, Japan
 Zapopan, Mexico

Cheonan

 Beaverton, United States
 Büyükçekmece, Turkey
 Shijiazhuang, China
 Wendeng (Weihai), China

Cheongdo
 Nenjiang, China

Cheongju

 Bellingham, United States
 Tottori, Japan
 Wuhan, China

Cheorwon
 Đồng Tháp, Vietnam

Chuncheon

 Addis Ababa, Ethiopia
 Higashichikuma District, Japan
 Hōfu, Japan
 Kakamigahara, Japan

Chungju

 Taichung, Taiwan
 Yugawara, Japan

D
Daegu

 Almaty, Kazakhstan
 Atlanta, United States
 Chengdu, China
 Da Nang, Vietnam
 Hiroshima, Japan
 Milan, Italy
 Milwaukee, United States
 Minas Gerais, Brazil
 Ningbo, China
 Plovdiv, Bulgaria
 Qingdao, China
 Saint Petersburg, Russia
 Taipei, Taiwan

Daegu – Seo

 Bacolod, Philippines
 Hexi (Tianjin), China
 Keqiao (Shaoxing), China

Daejeon

 Bình Dương, Vietnam
 Brisbane, Australia

 Calgary, Canada
 Durban, South Africa
 Guadalajara, Mexico
 Montgomery County, United States
 Nanjing, China
 Novosibirsk, Russia
 Ōda, Japan
 Sapporo, Japan
 Seattle, United States
 Shenyang, China
 Uppsala, Sweden

Daejeon – Jung

 Malabon, Philippines
 Xining, China

Daejeon – Seo

 Khövsgöl, Mongolia
 Wenling, China

Daejeon – Yuseong
 Xigang (Dalian), China

Dangjin

 Rizhao, China
 Snohomish County, United States

Donghae

 Bolu, Turkey
 Federal Way, United States
 Haikou, China
 Jiamusi, China
 Nakhodka, Russia
 Saint John, Canada
 Tsuruga, Japan
 Tumen, China

G
Gangneung

 Algemesí, Spain
 Chattanooga, United States
 Chichibu, Japan
 Deyang, China
 Irkutsk, Russia
 Jiaxing, China
 Jingzhou, China

Gimcheon

 Chengdu, China
 Nanao, Japan
 Subang, Indonesia

Gimhae

 Ayodhya, India
 Biên Hòa, Vietnam
 Munakata, Japan
 Salem, United States
 Wuxi, China

Gimpo

 Glendale, United States
 Heze, China

Goyang

 Eisenstadt, Austria
 Hakodate, Japan
 Heerhugowaard, Netherlands
 Loudoun County, United States
 Maui County, United States
 Qiqihar, China
 San Bernardino, United States

Gunsan

 Jamshedpur, India
 Pimpri-Chinchwad, India
 Tacoma, United States
 Windsor, Canada
 Yantai, China

Guri

 Calamba, Philippines
 Carrollton, United States

Gurye

 Chizhou, China
 Unzen, Japan

Gwacheon

 Burlington, United States
 Nanning, China
 Shirahama, Japan

Gwangju

 Changzhi, China
 Guangzhou, China
 Medan, Indonesia
 San Antonio, United States
 Sendai, Japan
 Tainan, Taiwan

Gwangmyeong

 Austin, United States
 Liaocheng, China
 Osnabrück, Germany
 Yamato, Japan

Gyeongju

 Huế, Vietnam
 Nara, Japan
 Nitra, Slovakia
 Obama, Japan
 Pompei, Italy
 Versailles, France
 Xi'an, China

Gyeongsan

 Jōyō, Japan
 Xihai'an (Qingdao), China

H
Hanam

 Little Rock, United States
 Rushan, China
 Shah Alam, Malaysia

Hoengseong

 Kakegawa, Japan
 Linhai, China
 Yazu, Japan

Hongcheon
 Sanary-sur-Mer, France

I
Icheon

 Jingdezhen, China
 Kōka, Japan
 Limoges, France
 Santa Fe, United States 
 Seto, Japan

Iksan

 Culver City, United States
 Odense, Denmark
 Zhenjiang, China

Incheon

 Alexandria, Egypt
 Anchorage, United States
 Banten, Indonesia
 Burbank, United States
 Chongqing, China
 Haiphong, Vietnam
 Honolulu, United States
 Kitakyushu, Japan
 Kobe, Japan
 Kolkata, India
 Manila, Philippines
 Mérida, Mexico
 Panama City, Panama
 Philadelphia, United States
 Phnom Penh, Cambodia
 Shenyang, China
 Tel Aviv, Israel
 Ulaanbaatar, Mongolia
 Veneto, Italy
 Vladivostok, Russia
 Yekaterinburg, Russia

Incheon – Gyeyang

 Battambang, Cambodia
 Vũng Tàu, Vietnam
 Yancheng, China

J
Jangheung

 Acheng (Harbin), China
 Bacoor, Philippines
 Changxing, China
 Claver, Philippines

 Haiyan, China
 Washington County, United States

Jecheon

 Hualien, Taiwan
 Pasay, Philippines
 Qichun, China
 Spokane, United States
 Zhangshu, China

Jeju City

 Guilin, China
 Laizhou, China
 Rouen, France
 Sanda, Japan
 Santa Rosa, United States
 Wakayama, Japan

Jeonju

 Antalya, Turkey
 Kanazawa, Japan
 San Diego, United States
 Suzhou, China

Jinju

 Eugene, United States
 Kitami, Japan
 Winnipeg, Canada
 Xi'an, China

M
Miryang

 Nanping, China
 Ōmihachiman, Japan
 Yasugi, Japan

Mokpo

 Beppu, Japan
 Hammerfest, Norway
 Lianyungang, China
 Xiamen, China

N
Naju

 Kurayoshi, Japan
 Wenatchee, United States

Namyangju

 Changzhou, China
 Dartford, England, United Kingdom
 Kampong Cham, Cambodia
 Vinh, Vietnam

Nonsan

 Jining, China
 Jinzhou, China
 Langfang, China

O
Osan

 Hidaka, Japan
 Killeen, United States
 Quảng Nam, Vietnam

P
Paju

 Coquitlam, Canada
 Cuenca, Spain
 Eskişehir, Turkey
 Hadano, Japan
 Jinzhou, China
 Mudanjiang, China
 Rancagua, Chile
 Sasebo, Japan
 Stellenbosch, South Africa
 Toowoomba, Australia

Pohang

 Fukuyama, Japan
 Hunchun, China
 İzmit, Turkey
 Jōetsu, Japan
 Pittsburg, United States
 Vladivostok, Russia

Pyeongtaek

 Aomori, Japan
 Mobile, United States
 Rizhao, China

S
Samcheok

 Akabira, Japan
 Dongying, China
 Jixi, China
 Kanda, Japan
 Korsakov, Russia
 Kungur, Russia
 Kurobe, Japan
 Leesburg, United States
 Mareeba, Australia
 Wangqing, China

Sejong has no sister cities.

Seogwipo

 Hangzhou, China

 Kashima, Japan
 Kinokawa, Japan
 Salinas, United States
 Xingcheng, China

Seongnam

 Aurora, United States
 Piracicaba, Brazil
 Shenyang, China

Seoul

 Ankara, Turkey
 Astana, Kazakhstan
 Athens, Greece
 Bangkok, Thailand
 Beijing, China
 Bogotá, Colombia
 Cairo, Egypt
 Hanoi, Vietnam
 Honolulu, United States
 Jakarta, Indonesia
 Mexico City, Mexico
 Moscow, Russia
 New South Wales, Australia

 San Francisco, United States
 São Paulo, Brazil
 Taipei, Taiwan
 Tashkent, Uzbekistan
 Tokyo, Japan
 Ulaanbaatar, Mongolia
 Warsaw, Poland
 Washington, D.C., United States

Seoul – Dobong
 Changping (Beijing), China

Seoul – Eunpyeong
 Canterbury, Australia

Seoul – Gangdong

 Fengtai (Beijing), China

 Musashino, Japan
 Qinhuangdao, China
 Segovia, Spain
 Songino Khairkhan (Ulaanbaatar), Mongolia
 Tangshan, China
 Willoughby, Australia

Seoul – Gangnam

 Chaoyang (Beijing), China
 Grand Rapids, United States
 Gwinnett County, United States
 Licheng (Jinan), China
 Riverside, United States
 Woluwe-Saint-Pierre, Belgium
 Zhongshan (Dalian), China

Seoul – Gangseo

 Changning (Shanghai), China
 Otaru, Japan
 Penrith, Australia
 Tarlac City, Philippines
 Zhaoyuan, China

Seoul – Gwanak

 Daxing (Beijing), China
 Hohhot, China
 Kingston upon Thames, England, United Kingdom
 Tiexi (Shenyang), China
 Yanji, China

Seoul – Gwangjin

 Ereğli, Turkey
 Khan Uul (Ulaanbaatar), Mongolia

Seoul – Jongno
 Prague 1 (Prague), Czech Republic

Seoul – Jungnang

 Dongcheng (Beijing), China
 Kazanlak, Bulgaria
 Meguro (Tokyo), Japan

Seoul – Mapo

 Katsushika (Tokyo), Japan
 Shijingshan (Beijing), China

Seoul – Seocho

 Cuauhtémoc (Mexico City), Mexico
 Irvine, United States
 Laoshan (Qingdao), China
 Manhattan (New York), United States
 Perth, Australia
 Şişli, Turkey
 South-Western AO (Moscow), Russia
 Suginami (Tokyo), Japan

Seoul – Songpa

 Asunción, Paraguay
 Chaoyang (Beijing), China
 Chingeltei (Ulaanbaatar), Mongolia
 Christchurch, New Zealand
 Fairfax County, United States
 Karaganda, Kazakhstan
 Minhang (Shanghai), China
 Panyu (Guangzhou), China
 Steglitz-Zehlendorf (Berlin), Germany
 Tonghua, China

Seoul – Yangcheon

 Bankstown, Australia
 Chaoyang (Changchun), China
 Nakano (Tokyo), Japan

Seoul – Yeongdeungpo

 Kishiwada, Japan
 Mentougou (Beijing), China
 Monterey Park, United States

Sinan
 Granbury, United States

Suncheon

 Antalya, Turkey
 Columbia, United States
 Izumi, Japan
 Kragujevac, Serbia
 Nantes, France
 Taiyuan, China

Suwon

 Asahikawa, Japan
 Bandung, Indonesia
 Cluj-Napoca, Romania
 Curitiba, Brazil
 Fez, Morocco
 Freiburg im Breisgau, Germany
 Hải Dương, Vietnam
 Jinan, China
 Nizhny Novgorod, Russia
 Siem Reap, Cambodia
 Toluca, Mexico
 Townsville, Australia
 Yalova, Turkey

T
Tongyeong

 Reedley, United States
 Rongcheng, China
 Samara, Russia
 Sayama, Japan
 Tamano, Japan
 Yunfu, China

U
Uiwang

 Kimitsu, Japan
 North Little Rock, United States
 Xianning, China

Ulsan

 Burgas, Bulgaria
 Changchun, China
 Hagi, Japan
 Houston, United States
 Hualien, Taiwan
 Khánh Hòa, Vietnam
 Kocaeli, Turkey
 Portland, United States
 Santos, Brazil
 Tomsk, Russia
 Wuxi, China

W
Wando

 Imari, Japan

 Lianyun (Lianyungang), China
 Rongcheng, China

Wonju

 Edmonton, Canada
 Hefei, China
 Roanoke, United States

Y
Yanggu

 Chizu, Japan
 Jianli, China
 Saint-Mandé, France

Yangju

 Dongying, China
 Fujieda, Japan
 Henrico County, United States

Yangyang

 Daisen, Japan
 Rokkasho, Japan
 Xiangzhou (Xiangyang), China

Yeoju

 Kamimine, Japan
 Tsunan, Japan

Yeongam

 Hirakata, Japan
 Huzhou, China

Yeongcheon

 Kaifeng, China
 Kuroishi, Japan

Yeongju

 Bozhou, China
 Fujinomiya, Japan
 Jining, China
 Nantou, Taiwan
 Shaoguan, China

Yesan
 Knoxville, United States

Yongin

 Fergana Region, Uzbekistan
 Fullerton, United States
 Kayseri, Turkey
 Kota Kinabalu, Malaysia
 Yangzhou, China

References

South Korea
Cities in South Korea
South Korea geography-related lists
Foreign relations of South Korea
Populated places in South Korea